This is a table of parliamentary delegations from Aosta Valley to the Chamber of Deputies and the Senate since 1946.

{| class="wikitable" style="font-size:95%; text-align:center"
|-
! Deputy
! Legislature
! Senator
|-
|Giulio Bordon(Indep. PSI)
|Constituent Assembly(1946–1948)
| 
|-
| Paolo Alfonso Farinet(DC)
| 1st Legislature(1948–1953)
| Ernest Page(DC)
|-
| Paolo Alfonso Farinet(DC)
| 2nd Legislature(1953–1958)
| Ernest Page(DC)
|-
| Severino Caveri(UV)
| 3rd Legislature(1958–1963)
| Renato Chabod(Indep. PSI)
|-
| Corrado Gex(UV)
| 4th Legislature(1963–1968)
| Renato Chabod(Indep. PSI)
|-
| Germanno Olietti(Indep. DC)
| 5th Legislature(1968–1972)
| Amato Berthet(DC)
|-
| Emilio Chanoux(UVP)
| 6th Legislature(1972–1976)
| Giuseppe Filliétróz(UVP)
|-
| Ruggero Millet(Indep. PCI)
| 7th Legislature(1976–1979)
| Pierre Fosson(UV)
|-
| Cesare Dujany(DP)
| 8th Legislature(1979–1983)
| Pierre Fosson(UV)
|-
| Cesare Dujany(DP)
| 9th Legislature(1983–1987)
| Pierre Fosson(UV)
|-
| Luciano Caveri(UV)
| 10th Legislature(1987–1992)
| Cesare Dujany(ADP)
|-
| Luciano Caveri(UV)
| 11th Legislature(1992–1994)
| Cesare Dujany(ADP)
|-
| Luciano Caveri(UV)
| 12th Legislature(1994–1996)
| Cesare Dujany(PVdA)
|-
| Luciano Caveri(UV)
| 13th Legislature(1996–2001)
| Guido Dondeynaz(Indep. UV)
|-
| Ivo Collé(SA)
| 14th Legislature(2001–2006)
| Augusto Rollandin(UV)
|-
| Roberto Nicco(Indep. DS)
| 15th Legislature(2006–2008)
| Carlo Perrin(RV)
|-
| Roberto Nicco(Indep. PD)
| 16th Legislature(2008–2013)
| Antonio Fosson(UV)
|-
| Rudi Marguerettaz(SA)
| 17th Legislature(2013–2018)
| Albert Lanièce(UV)
|-
| Elisa Tripodi(M5S)
| 18th Legislature(2018–2022)
| Albert Lanièce(UV)
|-
| Franco Manes(UV)
| 19th Legislature(2022–present)
| Nicoletta Spelgatti(LVdA–Lega)
|}

Source: Council of the Valley – History of Aosta Valley

Politics of Aosta Valley